Adscape is a San Francisco in-game advertising company that was acquired by Google on February 15, 2007, for US$23 million. Adscape was founded in 2002 by Dan Willis, a former Nortel engineer. Adscape was launched in February 2006 with $3.2 million in funding from HIG Ventures, a venture capital company based in Atlanta, Georgia. The company offers services including delivering dynamic advertisements to video games. It has yet to form any partnerships with any game publishers as of its acquisition by Google.

Google's acquisition of the company grants it Adscape's patents. Google commented on the acquisition by saying in a press release, "As more and more people spend time playing video games, we think we can create opportunities for advertisers to reach their target audiences while maintaining a high quality, engaging user experience." This acquisition was in part fueled by Microsoft's purchase of in-game advertisement company Massive Incorporated, which already has secured deals with game publishers including Ubisoft, THQ, and Take-Two Interactive, for $200 million in 2006. One expert commented on the acquisition, saying, “There is a whole world of difference between the form of advertising done by Google and Madison Avenue. [...] While everyone appreciates the dollars Google can throw around, when it comes to [in-game ad] experience they just don’t have it.” Adscape moved from its offices in Atlanta to Google's headquarters in Mountain View, California, in March 2007. The company's leadership includes Dan Willis as Chief Technical Officer, Bernie Stolar as Chairman, and Eva Woo as vice president of marketing.

References

External links
 Google has acquired Adscape Media

Google
Video game companies of the United States
Marketing companies established in 2006
Companies based in San Francisco
Google acquisitions